This is a list of resignations from the second government formed by Prime Minister Boris Johnson. Since forming a government on 13 December 2019 after the general election, Johnson has faced the resignation of 10 cabinet ministers (one of whom resigned on two separate occasions) and 3 ministers 'attending cabinet'. This list omits ministers who were invited to leave the government during the cabinet reshuffle. It also excludes all ministers who resigned during the previous government formed by Boris Johnson.

2020

2021

2022

See also 
List of departures from the second May ministry
2020 British cabinet reshuffle
2021 British cabinet reshuffle
2022 British cabinet reshuffle

Notes

References 

2020 in British politics
Boris Johnson
History of the Conservative Party (UK)
Consequences of the 2016 United Kingdom European Union membership referendum
Consequences of Brexit
Lists of departures from the British government by Ministry